The Islamabad High Court is the senior court of the Islamabad Capital Territory, Pakistan, with appellate jurisdiction over the following district courts:

 Islamabad District Court (East)
 Islamabad District Court (West)
Justice Aamer Farooq is the current Chief Justice, having taken oath on 11 November 2022.

History 
The Court was originally established on 14 August 2007 by Presidential Order of Pervez Musharraf, the military ruler at the time. The Court ceased to exist on 31 July 2009 by a decision of the Supreme Court of Pakistan following Constitution Petition No. 09 and 08 of 2009.

The Court was re-established by the Islamabad High Court Act, 2010 following the 18th Amendment to the Constitution of Pakistan. President Asif Ali Zardari administered the oath to the first Chief Justice, Iqbal Hameed ur Rahman on 3 January 2011 at the Governor's House, Karachi.

Current composition 
The Islamabad High Court is headed by a Chief Justice. The bench consists of six Justices and additional judges. The mandatory retirement age of the Chief Justice and Justices is 62 years. The Additional Judges were initially appointed for one year. After that, their services could either be extended or they could be confirmed or they were retired. The current composition of the High Court is as follows:

List of former chief justices

See also 
 Islamabad District Court
 List of Chief Justices of Islamabad High Court
 List of Justices of Islamabad High Court
 Judiciary of Pakistan
 Islamabad Bar Council

References

External links 
 

 
High Courts of Pakistan
Court system of Pakistan
Islamabad Capital Territory